Arago may refer to:

People
 Aragó, a family name of the kings of the Aragonese Crown
 Étienne Arago (1802–1892), French journalist, theater director, and politician; brother of Juan, François, and Jacques
 François Arago (1786–1853), French mathematician, physicist, astronomer, and politician; brother of Juan, Jacques, and Étienne
 Jacques Arago (1790–1855), French writer, artist and explorer; brother of Juan, François, and Étienne
 Josep Riera i Aragó (born 1954), Catalan artist
 Marie Arago (1755–1845), French mother of the six Arago brothers

Places

Earth
Aragó, the name for Aragon in Catalan
Arago, Oregon, United States, an unincorporated community
Arago Township, Minnesota, United States
Cape Arago, Cape Arago State Park, Oregon, United States
Arago Glacier, Graham Land, Antarctica
Arago cave, Tautavel, France, a site where prehistoric remains of Tautavel Man were discovered
Arago hotspot, a geological hotspot near the Arago seamount in the south Pacific Ocean

Outer space
 Arago (lunar crater)
 Arago (Martian crater), named after François Arago
 1005 Arago, an asteroid
 one of the rings of Neptune, named in honor of François Arago

Ships
 USC&GS Arago, two ships of the United States Coast Survey and United States Coast and Geodetic Survey
 USS Arago, an armed survey ship that served in the United States Navy from 1861 to 1863
 SS Arago (1855), a steam ship used for mail and passenger service and, during the American Civil War, as a troop transport
 French submarine Arago (1912–1921)

Other uses
 Lycée Arago (Paris), France, a secondary school
 Arago telescope, a refractor at Paris Observatory, Paris, France
 Arago, a character in Ronin Warriors, see Talpa

See also
Arago spot, optical phenomenon
Aragoscope, a type of telescope design
Arago's rotations, magnetic phenomenon